Emanuel Robert "Sonny" Senerchia (April 6, 1931 – November 1, 2003) was an American professional baseball player who appeared in 29 games of Major League Baseball with the  Pittsburgh Pirates and later became a professional musician as well as a teacher and college baseball coach.

He was born and brought up in Newark, New Jersey, and attended Montclair State University, where he earned bachelor's degrees in physical education and English; he then received a master's degree in music from Trenton State College. According to his obituary, Senerchia was an accomplished violinist as a boy, appearing at Carnegie Hall at the age of ten, and as an adult he was a concert violinist with the New Jersey Symphony, the Garden State Arts Center Orchestra, and the Toms River Symphony. He also performed as a violinist with Pearl Bailey, Jack Benny and others. As a jazz musician, he played clarinet, saxophone, flute and piano in ensembles and big bands.

Senerchia's professional baseball career lasted for eight seasons (1949; 1952–58). Mostly a third baseman early in his career, he later converted to pitcher as a minor leaguer.

However, he appeared in the Major Leagues almost exclusively as a third baseman, starting 26 games at the position for the last place Pirates during the final six weeks of the 1952 season, in which they lost 112 out of the 154 games they played. Although he would collect only 22 hits in an even 100 at bats, Senerchia had some shining moments. On August 24 at Forbes Field, he had three hits in four at bats, including his first Major League home run (off future TV broadcaster Ernie Johnson), which proved to be decisive in a 4–3 victory over the Boston Braves. He hit his final MLB homer off future Baseball Hall of Famer Hoyt Wilhelm of the New York Giants on September 11.

After his playing days ended, Senerchia became a teacher and head baseball coach of Monmouth University, as well as a professional musician. He also was a race car driver and private pilot, and appeared on local TV and radio as a sports personality, living in Long Branch, Ocean Township and Spring Lake, where he resided for 20 years. He died from injuries suffered in a motorcycle accident in Freehold Township, New Jersey, at age 72.

References

External links

 Sonny Senerchia at SABR (Baseball BioProject)

1931 births
2003 deaths
Accidental deaths in New Jersey
Allentown Cardinals players
Baseball players from Newark, New Jersey
Burlington-Graham Pirates players
Columbus Cardinals players
Houston Buffaloes players
Longview Pirates players
Louisville Colonels (minor league) players
Major League Baseball third basemen
Montclair State Red Hawks baseball players
Monmouth Hawks baseball coaches
Motorcycle road incident deaths
Nashville Vols players
New Orleans Pelicans (baseball) players
Sportspeople from Long Branch, New Jersey
Sportspeople from Monmouth County, New Jersey
People from Spring Lake, New Jersey
Pittsburgh Pirates players
Road incident deaths in New Jersey
Savannah Redlegs players
Sioux City Soos players
Waco Pirates players
Lima Chiefs players